Langgaard is a surname of Danish origin. Notable people with this surname include: 
Rued Langgaard - Danish composer and organist 
 - Danish pianist and composer, father of Rued Langgaard
Johannes Peter Langgaard - Danish mechanician, bricklayer and businessman, father of Siegfried, and grandfather of Rued Langgaard
Jacoba Langgaard - Faroese football midfielder

See also
Lynggaard

Danish-language surnames